Marcato (short form: Marc.; Italian for marked) is a musical instruction indicating a note, chord, or passage is to be played louder or more forcefully than the surrounding music. The instruction may involve the word marcato itself written above or below the staff or it may take the form of the symbol ∧, an open vertical wedge. The marcato is essentially a louder version of the regular accent > (an open horizontal wedge).

Like the regular accent, however, the marcato is often interpreted to suggest a sharp attack tapering to the original dynamic, an interpretation which applies only to instruments capable of altering the dynamic level of a single sustained pitch. According to author James Mark Jordan, "the marcato sound is characterised by a rhythmic thrust followed by a decay of the sound."

The instruction marcato or marcatissimo (extreme marcato), among various other instructions, symbols, and expression marks may prompt a string player to use martellato bowing, depending on the musical context.  An example is the Gavotte in D major from J. S. Bach (Suzuki Book Volume 3) page 19, Bar 39.

References

Articulations (music)
Italian words and phrases